The 1931 Cornell Big Red football team was an American football team that represented Cornell University during the 1931 college football season.  In their 12th season under head coach Gil Dobie, the Big Red compiled a 7–1 record and outscored their opponents by a combined total of 239 to 20.

The traditional Thanksgiving game against Penn attracted a reported crowd of 70,000 to Franklin Field. Cornell's 7-0 win earned a story on the front page of The Philadelphia Inquirer along with a detailed quarter-by-quarter description of the game in the newspaper.

Schedule

References

Cornell
Cornell Big Red football seasons
Cornell Big Red football